The Poya were a subgroup of indigenous Tehuelche people living in the Andes of Llanquihue and Palena Province as well as on the southern shores of Nahuel Huapi Lake in present-day Argentina. The Jesuit priest Nicolás Mascardi divided the Poya language into two linguistically distinct groups: the one spoken by the "comarcanos" of Nahuelhuapi and another one spoken further east as far away as the Atlantic Ocean.

References 

History of Patagonia
Indigenous peoples in Argentina
Pre-Columbian cultures
Indigenous peoples in Chile
Ethnic groups in Chile
Ethnic groups in Argentina
Indigenous peoples of the Andes